James McCord (November 23, 1932 – September 28, 2009) was an American football coach.  He was the head football at Jamestown College—now known as the University of Jamestown—in Jamestown, North Dakota, serving for one season, in 1964, and compiling a record of 1–7.  McCord died at Bismarck, North Dakota in 2009. He was buried at North Dakota Veterans Cemetery.

Head coaching record

References

1932 births
2009 deaths
Jamestown Jimmies football coaches
Sports coaches from Minneapolis